The Republic of Macedonia competed at the 1996 Summer Olympics in Atlanta, United States. It was the first appearance of the nation at the Olympic Games after it seceded from Yugoslavia in 1991.

Canoeing

Men

Women

Shooting

Men

Swimming

Men

Women

Wrestling

Freestyle

References

External links
Official Olympic Reports
 sports-reference

Nations at the 1996 Summer Olympics
1996
Summer Olympics